Anepholcia pygaria is a moth in the family Noctuidae. It is found on Peninsular Malaysia, Sumatra and Borneo.

The forewings are mottled, bronzy brown and the hindwings are yellow with a dark brown border.

References

Moths described in 1912
Moths of Borneo
Moths of Malaysia
Moths of Sumatra
Pantheinae